The M224 60 mm Lightweight Company Mortar System (LWCMS) is a smooth bore, muzzle-loading, high-angle-of-fire mortar used for close-in support of ground troops. It was deployed extensively in the War in Afghanistan by the United States military.

Description
The M224 system is composed of these parts:

 M225 Cannon: 
 M170 Bipod: 
 M7A1 Baseplate for use in conventional mode:  or
 M8 baseplate for use in handheld mode: 
 M64A1 Sight Unit (The M67 Sight Unit is now widely used for the system): 

The mount consists of a bipod and a base plate, which is provided with screw type elevating and traversing mechanisms to elevate/traverse the mortar. The M64A1 sight unit is attached to the bipod mount. The mortar can be fired in the conventional mode or the handheld mode. This smooth-bore system can be gravity-fired or fired by using a manual spring-loaded trigger.

It is typically fielded at the infantry company level. A small mortar section with two mortars was organic to Army rifle companies (light, airborne, air assault) and Ranger companies. Marine rifle companies have a section with three 60mm mortars in the company weapons platoon.

History
The M224 LWCMS (Lightweight Company Mortar System) replaced the older (WWII-era) 60 mm M2 mortar and the inaccurate M19 Mortar and began fielding as prototypes in the mid-1970s during the Vietnam War. The M2s and M19s had an effective range of only .

In 2011, an improved M224A1 version was brought into service. The M224A1 consists of the M225A1 tube, M170A1 bipod assembly, M7A1 baseplate, M8 auxiliary baseplate and the M64A1 sight unit. By reducing the number of components and using lighter materials, the M224A1 mortar system weighs at about 37.5 lbs (17 kg) which is 20% less with a reduction of  compared to the original M224. The US Army plans to replace all legacy M224s with the new M224A1. Concurrently, a lighter version of the 81mm M252 mortar was also developed.

Ammunition
The M224 Mortar can fire the following principal classifications of training and service ammunition:
 High explosive (HE): Designations M888, M720, and M720A1. Used against personnel and light material targets.
 M1061: Improved HE with insensitive munitions performance-enhancing fragmentation warhead.
 Smoke Cartridge (WP): Designation M722. Used as a screening, signaling, or marking munition.
 Illumination (ILLUM): Used in night missions requiring illumination for assistance in observation.
 Training practice (TP): Designation M50A2/A3. Used for training in limited areas. These rounds are obsolete and no longer used.
 Red Phosphorus: Can not be fired by the 60mm mortar
 Full Range Practice Cartridges (FRPC): Designation M769. This round is used for practice or clearing misfires.
 M1061 MAPAM: SAAB Technologies produced Multi-Purpose Anti-Personnel Anti-Material round.

Fuzes
The M224 rounds have three fuze types: The Multioption Fuze (M734), the Point-Detonating Fuze (M525), and Timer fuze. The M734 is used for the M720 HE round and can be set to function as proximity burst, near-surface burst, impact burst, or delay burst.

Gallery

See also
General articles:
Artillery
Military technology and equipment
Mortar (weapon)
Similar weapons:
M252 mortar
M6 mortar - comparable Austrian 60mm mortar
Listings:
 List of artillery
 List of crew served weapons of the US Armed Forces

References

External links

 US Army Fact File: M224
 Operators manual – USMC
 (video) DVIDS: US Marines testing firing M224A1, July 2011

Infantry mortars
Mortars of the United States
United States Marine Corps equipment
60mm mortars
Military equipment introduced in the 1970s